United Nations Security Council Resolution 2623 called for the eleventh emergency special session of the United Nations General Assembly on the subject of the 2022 Russian invasion of Ukraine. Albania and the United States introduced the resolution before the United Nations Security Council, which adopted it on 27 February 2022. Russia voted against while China, India and the United Arab Emirates abstained. As this was a procedural resolution, no permanent member could exercise their veto power.

Basis

United Nations General Assembly Resolution 377, the "Uniting for Peace" resolution, adopted 3 November 1950, states that in any cases where the Security Council, because of a lack of unanimity among its five permanent members (P5), fails to act as required to maintain international peace and security, the General Assembly shall consider the matter immediately and may issue appropriate recommendations to UN members for collective measures, including the use of armed force when necessary, in order to maintain or restore international peace and security.

Resolution 2623 was the 13th time the Uniting for Peace resolution has been invoked to call an emergency session of the General Assembly, including the 8th such invocation by the Security Council.

Result 
The eleventh emergency special session of the UNGA convened several times and passed the following resolutions:

 Resolution ES-11/1 "Aggression against Ukraine", March 2, 2022, 141–5–35 (for–against–abstained)
 Resolution ES-11/2 "Humanitarian consequences of the aggression against Ukraine", March 24, 2022, 140–5–38
 Resolution ES-11/3 "Suspension of the rights of membership of the Russian Federation in the Human Rights Council", April 7, 2022, 93–24–58

Voting
Voting took place both in the General Council and in the Security Council.

Security Council 

There are 15 voting members present for the Security Council meeting that occurred on 27 February 2022. Eleven members approved, only one opposed, and three members abstained.
 

Permanent members of the Security Council are shown in bold.

The emergency special session was called as a result and met on 28 February 2022.

See also

 Eleventh emergency special session of the United Nations General Assembly
 Legality of the 2022 Russian invasion of Ukraine
 List of United Nations Security Council Resolutions 2601 to 2700 (2021–present)

References

External links

Text of the Resolution at undocs.org

2623
2623
 2623
February 2022 events
2022 in Ukraine
Reactions to the 2022 Russian invasion of Ukraine
Russo-Ukrainian War
Ukraine and the United Nations
Russia and the United Nations
2022 in Russia